Houghton Lake may refer to:

Michigan
 Houghton Lake (Michigan), located in Roscommon County; state's largest inland lake
 Houghton Lake, Michigan, an unincorporated community and census-designated place
Houghton Lake Heights, Michigan, an unincorporated community
Houghton Lake State Airport, an airport within Houghton Lake Heights
 Houghton Lake Flats Flooding State Wildlife Management Area, a protected area in Roscommon County
 Houghton Lake (Ogemaw County, Michigan), a small lake in Ogemaw County

Other
 Houghton Lake, (Indiana), a small lake in Marshall County, Indiana
 Houghton Lake (Saskatchewan), a lake in the Lenore Lake (Saskatchewan) basin
 Lake Houghton (glacial) was a precursor of Lake Huron

See also
 Houghton, Michigan